The  is a Japanese railway line in Hyōgo Prefecture, between Ao, Ono and Hōjōmachi, Kasai. The third sector company took former Japanese National Railways line in 1985. The line links Hōjō, a central town of Kasai, and two railway lines, namely JR West Kakogawa Line and Shintetsu Ao Line.

Basic data
Distance: 13.6 km / 8.5 mi.
Gauge: 1,067 mm / 3 ft. 6 in.
Stations: 8
Double-track line: None
Electric supply: Not electrified
Railway signalling: Staff token

History
The  opened the line in 1915.

Freight services ceased in 1974, and in 1985 the Hojo Railway Company commenced operating the line.

Accidents
On 31 March 1945 a Kawanishi N1K fighter on a test flight made an emergency landing near Abiki that damaged the line resulting in a derailment that killed 11 and injured 104 passengers.

Stations

See also

List of railway companies in Japan
List of railway lines in Japan

References

This article incorporates material from the corresponding article in the Japanese Wikipedia

External links 
  

Railway lines in Japan
Rail transport in Hyōgo Prefecture
Japanese third-sector railway lines